The coat of arms of Courland (Kurzeme), a historical region in western Latvia, has been known since the 16th century and depicts a lion gules on a silver background.

History

Since 1565, the coat of arms of the Duchy of Courland and Semigallia was combined of four parts and included the coat of arms of Semigallia, an elk on blue field.

After the Duchy of Courland and Semigallia became a vassal state of the Polish–Lithuanian Commonwealth, a shield with the combined symbols of the ruling House of Kettler and of Polish-Lithuanian kings Stephen Báthory, Sigismund II Augustus and others was placed in the centre of the coat of arms.

In 1795, Courland and Semigallia became part of the Russian Empire as the Courland Governorate. On 6 December 1856, the governorate was officially granted a coat of arms which was based on the historical coat of arms of the duchy.

After the establishment of the independent Latvian state, the symbol of Courland became part of the newly created Coat of arms of Latvia. The red lion representing Courland became an element of the shield and one of the supporters. The coat of arms was in official usage in Latvia until the Soviet occupation of Latvia in 1940. In 1990, shortly before the restoration of independence, the coat of arms was restored.

The official current version of the coat of arms of Courland as a historical and cultural region of Latvia was approved in 2012. While Courland is not a separate administrative unit within Latvia, the coat of arms is used by the Kurzeme Planning Region.

Gallery

See also
 Coat of arms of Semigallia
 Coat of arms of Livonia

References

Courland
Courland
16th-century establishments in Latvia
Duchy of Courland and Semigallia